Patty Loverock (born 21 February 1953) is a Canadian sprinter. She competed in the women's 100 metres and 200 metres at the 1976 Summer Olympics, where she got to the semi-finals in both events. She set a Canadian record of 23.03 in her quarter-final of the women's 200 metres. Loverock ran second leg of the women's 4 x 100 metres relay at the Montreal Olympics, the team set a Canadian and Commonwealth record of 43.17 second finishing in 4th place.

She finished second in the 1975 Pan American Games 100 metres and third in the 4 × 100 metres relay. Patty would take a bronze medal at the World Student Games in Rome. At the 1971 Pan American Games Loverock finished eighth in the 200 metres. She would finished eighth in the 200 metres at the 1974 Commonwealth Games in Christchurch. She won a bronze medal in the 4 x 100 relay at the 1970 British Commonwealth Games and a silver medal in the same event at the 1978 Games in Edmonton. She won a silver and bronze medal in the 4 x 100 metres relay at two Pacific Conference Games in 1973 and 1977. In 1978 she set a world indoor record for 60 yards, with a time of 6.78. Patty also set the Canadian record for the 100 metres with at time of 11.34, in 1975.

References

External links
 

1953 births
Living people
Athletes (track and field) at the 1976 Summer Olympics
Canadian female sprinters
Olympic track and field athletes of Canada
Athletes from Vancouver
Athletes (track and field) at the 1971 Pan American Games
Athletes (track and field) at the 1975 Pan American Games
Pan American Games silver medalists for Canada
Pan American Games bronze medalists for Canada
Pan American Games medalists in athletics (track and field)
Athletes (track and field) at the 1970 British Commonwealth Games
Athletes (track and field) at the 1974 British Commonwealth Games
Athletes (track and field) at the 1978 Commonwealth Games
Universiade medalists in athletics (track and field)
Commonwealth Games medallists in athletics
Commonwealth Games silver medallists for Canada
Commonwealth Games bronze medallists for Canada
Universiade bronze medalists for Canada
Medalists at the 1975 Summer Universiade
Medalists at the 1975 Pan American Games
Olympic female sprinters
Medallists at the 1970 British Commonwealth Games
Medallists at the 1978 Commonwealth Games